A series of massacres were committed by Ottoman and Italian forces during the Italo-Turkish War. In October 1911, Ottoman forces massacred captured Italian troops at Sciara Sciat (Arabic: Shar al-Shatt). In reprisal, Italian troops massacred several thousand civilians in the Mechiya oasis.

Background
Italy invaded Ottoman Tripolitania (Ottoman Libya) in 1911 with the purpose of annexing the territory as an Italian colony; the Ottomans resisted the Italian invasion and the result was the Italo-Turkish War. Some Arabs collaborated with the Italians, mainly in the city of Tripoli, but those in the interior of Libya largely supported the Turks due to their shared religion. During the war Italian troops used indiscriminate violence many times to subdue the native civilians.

Sciara Sciat massacre

On 23 October 1911, Italian troops were attacked by a 10,000-strong Ottoman force while marching through the Mechiya oasis, at a place called Sciara Sciat. Some accounts stated that Turkish forces captured two companies of the Italian infantry in a nearby cemetery and massacred 503 men. Italian corpses were allegedly nailed to trees with their eyes and genitals mutilated, some claim in retaliation for sexual offenses against local women perpetrated by the Italian troops.

Mechiya oasis massacre
On the next day, the Italian military responded by attacking the population of the neighboring Mechiya oasis, massacring about 4,000 people including women and children over the course of three days. Though the Italians allegedly took measures to prevent news of this action from reaching the outside world, foreign press correspondents covered the event in detail. This negative coverage factored into the British Parliament's decision later that month to take a more pro-Turkish course, rejecting a proposed Anglo-Italian Mediterranean agreement.

Contemporary accounts

Following the events, contemporary accounts supporting and opposing the Italian actions took opposing views of the incident:
For three days the oasis was given over to massacre in wholesale and detail. Some 4,000 men, women and children perished in the course of it – the vast bulk of whom were certainly innocent of any participation whatever in the Italian defeat. They were murdered in the streets, in their houses, farms, gardens, and according to a peculiarly horrible narrative by a British officer serving with the Turkish forces, in a mosque, where several hundred women and children had taken refuge. ... All the newspaper correspondents were in agreement as to the main facts.

Opposing arguments decried the foreign press reporting as overblown:
The wildest accusations launched against the Italian troops by half a dozen hysterial - and to put it mildly - inaccurate journalists, most of whom spoke not a word of Italian or Arabic, found ready credence, and the cry of "Italian atrocities" was raised with great effect. ... It must of course be remembered that many of the people who in England were shrieking against Italy, people who had no notion of the meaning of evidence, were the same who, during the Boer war, had shrieked against England, and talked about British "methods of barbarism"...

Commemoration
A monument to the Italian infantrymen killed at Sciara Sciat, sculpted by Publio Morbiducci, was erected at the Piazzale di Porta Pia in 1932.

Citations

References

 
 
 
 
 
 
 
 

1911 in Libya
Ethnic cleansing in Africa
History of Tripolitania
Italo-Turkish War
Massacres committed by Italy
Massacres in 1911
Massacres in Libya
Mass murder in 1911
Racism in Libya